St. Elijah's Church is an Orthodox church in Moscopole, Korçë County, Albania. It is a Cultural Monument of Albania.

History and description
The St. Elijah Church in Moscopole, Albania is 11.5m tall, 20m long, and 13m large. It has a flat ceiling on the lateral aisles. The naos is basilica-type and is divided into three aisles (the nave and the two lateral aisles) by two files of columns. The columns are made of stone and are connected by longitudinal arches, on top of which tall walls divide the aisles. The central nave is illuminated by windows that are on the lateral aisles. The cloister is on the southern side, as well as the narthex. There is no cloister on the western side. The yard of the church had walls, at the angle of which existed a bell tower, both of which have been restored.

References

Cultural Monuments of Albania
Churches in Moscopole